Double Dubliners is The Dubliners' ninth studio album. It is also known as Alive and Well, the title it was released under on the Polydor label It's the Dubliners site for the album. A standout track here is a recitation by Ronnie Drew of Pádraig Pearse's poem "The Rebel". This album features the original members. Other notable tracks here are "The Sun Is Burning" and "The Night Visiting Song", both sung by Luke Kelly. In December 1983, "The Night Visiting Song" would become the final song to be performed by Luke Kelly with The Dubliners on Irish television.

Track listing

Side one 
 "Free the People"
 "The Louse House of Kilkenny"
 "The Springhill Disaster"
 "The Musical Priest/The Blackthorn Stick"
 "Champion at Keeping Them Rolling"
 "The Sun Is Burning"

Side two 
 "Gentleman Soldier"
 "The Rebel"
 "The Gartan Mother's Lullaby"
 "Drops of Brandy/Lady Carberry"
 "Smith of Bristol"
 "The Night Visiting Song"

Personnel 

 Ciarán Bourke – tin whistle, harmonica, acoustic guitar, lead and backing vocals
 Ronnie Drew – acoustic guitar, lead and backing vocals
 Luke Kelly – banjo, lead and backing vocals
 Barney McKenna – tenor banjo, mandolin
 John Sheahan – fiddle, tin whistle, mandolin

Notes

 Produced by Phil Coulter who also penned the hit single "Free The People", which opens the album.

The Dubliners albums
1972 albums
Albums produced by Phil Coulter
EMI Records albums